

A vis-à-vis is a carriage in which the passengers sit face to face with the front passengers facing rearward and the rear passengers facing forward. The term comes from the French vis-à-vis, meaning face to face.

These carriages are still commonly made by Amish carriage makers in the midwestern United States. Also in the Western world, the vis-a-vis is the most common type of carriage style used to cart tourists and leisure seekers in downtown urban settings.

Passengers sit back-to-back on dos-à-dos carriages.

Examples 
The following types of carriage had vis-à-vis seating:
 Barouche
 Berline
 Landau

Automobiles

There were vis-à-vis automobiles in the early history of motoring. These were driven from the forward-facing rear seat, with front passengers sitting ahead of the steering controls and facing the driver. Passengers in the front seat would obstruct the vision of the driver in the rear seat, and the style fell out of favour before 1905.

See also 

 Types of carriages
 Car body styles

References

Carriages
Car body styles